Magic Matterhorn (1995) is an essayistic documentary by Swiss director Anka Schmid about the meaning of ones homeland, its clichés and reality. The mountain Matterhorn is the starting point for the portrayal of a ‚part-time‘ farmer from the Swiss mountain village Zermatt, a professional Swiss yodeler in Disneyland, California and the cabaret group called Geschwister Pfister.

Storyline 
In a playful manner the film embarks on the search for contemporary notions of homeland and shows real and surreal worlds. The film was shot in the Swiss tourist village Zermatt at the foot of the iconic mountain Matterhorn as well as in Disneyland in California where there is a copy of the Matterhorn. Anka Schmid confronts concrete living conditions with clichés and is not afraid of the balancing act between philosophical thoughts and kitsch-souvenirs. The Matterhorn serves as a leitmotif. People from Zermatt, tourists from all over the world and an American-Swiss explain their understanding of homeland and their relationship with the mystically superelevated mountain Matterhorn. The interviews are being accompanied by pictures of the mountain and performances by the cabaret-group.

Festivals 
 September 1995: Nyon, 26th Festival International du Cinéma Documentaire
 January 1996: Solothurn, 31st Solothurn Film Festival
 March 1996: Créteil 18, Festival International du Film de Femmes
 April/May 1996: Trento, 44th Filmfestival International Montagna Esplorazione
 April/May 1996: Minneapolis/St. Paul, 14th Rivertown International Film Festival
 September 1996: Les Diablerets, 27th Festival International du Film Alpin, receiving a special award by the jury
 September 1996: Figueira da Foz, 25th Festival international de cinéma

Reviews 
In the International Film Encyclopedia Magic Matterhorn is described as an "amusing documentary, which thanks to the contrasting juxtaposition of various views ended up being very multifaceted but over time is lacking identity."

References

External links 
 German article on Magic Matterhorn on www.hossli.com
 Magic Matterhorn on Swissfilms
 Magic Matterhorn on www.artfilm.ch

1995 films
Swiss documentary films
1995 documentary films
1990s German-language films
Swiss German-language films
Swiss independent films
1995 independent films